Daniel Henry Beekman (May 29, 1874 – February 1, 1951) was an American jurist, banker, and politician.

Early life and education 
Beekman was born on May 29, 1874 in North Branch, New Jersey, the son of John Henry Beekman and Mary Elizabeth Lane Beekman. His parents owned and operated a large farm in Somerset County. His ancestors emigrated from the Netherlands in 1648, descended from Rev. Gerardus Beekman (1558-1625), a Protestant scholar who participated in the translation of the Bible to English for King James I. He was a distant relative of Wilhelmus Beekman, the treasurer of the Dutch West India Company and a prominent 17th-century politician. Beekman attended North Branch public schools and Metz Private School for Boys, then matriculated at New York Law School, graduating in 1896.

Career 

Beekman was admitted to the bar in 1898 and settled in Somerville, New Jersey. His first legal job was in the law office of former Congressman Alvah A. Clark. In 1901, Beekman partnered with retired Judge John D. Bartine to establish a law firm in Somerville. In 1913, then-Governor Woodrow Wilson appointed Beekman Judge of the Somerset County Court of Common Pleas. He was reappointed by Governor James Fielder, presiding over the Court until 1920.

Following his tenure as judge, Beekman returned to his law firm and concurrently served as an executive of the Second National Bank of Somerville. He helped lead the bank through the Great Depression, during which runs caused many institutions to fail. Beekman credited Franklin Roosevelt's swift action after taking office in 1933 with saving the banking system and ultimately stabilizing markets. In 1937, Beekman was elected president of Second National Bank, a position he held until his death.

Beekman's son joined his law firm in 1929, at which time the firm began operating under the name Beekman & Beekman. His practice covered a range of matters, with a particular focus on real estate.

Beekman was active in state Democratic politics. After serving as judge, he ran for state senate in multiple elections in the late 1920s and early 1930s. During World War II, Beekman served as chairman of the Selective Service Board. He sat on the Board of Managers of the New Jersey Reformatory for Women at Clinton.

Personal life 
Beekman married Emetta Hoffmann in 1899. They had two children: son John Henry Beekman, Jr., and daughter Mabel Elizabeth Beekman. John Beekman, Jr. served as Somerset County Prosecutor and president of the Somerset County Bar Association. Mabel Beekman graduated the Yale School of Nursing and served as a supervisor in the New Jersey Department of Health.

Beekman was a deacon and elder of the First Reformed Church of Somerville and a member of various clubs including Raritan Valley Country Club, the Bachelors Club, the Somerville Athletic Association, and Solomon's Lodge 46. He died at Bound Brook Hospital.

References 

1874 births
1951 deaths
20th-century American judges
New Jersey lawyers
American bankers
New York Law School alumni
New Jersey Democrats
Politicians from Somerville, New Jersey
People from Branchburg, New Jersey
Beekman family